Erman Bulucu (born 9 March 1989) is a Turkish footballer who plays as a center back for TFF Second League club Kastamonuspor 1966.

External links

1989 births
People from Akhisar
Living people
Turkish footballers
Association football midfielders
Menemenspor footballers
Gaziantepspor footballers
Alanyaspor footballers
Manisaspor footballers
Elazığspor footballers
Büyükşehir Belediye Erzurumspor footballers
Altay S.K. footballers
Manisa FK footballers
Pendikspor footballers
Tarsus Idman Yurdu footballers
Süper Lig players
TFF First League players
TFF Second League players
TFF Third League players